Malcolm Ballard is a British former motorcycle speedway rider.

Ballard learned to ride a speedway bike at Eastbourne's winter training school, and signed for Division Two Eastbourne Eagles in 1971. He averaged over 8.7 in his first season, which also saw him get Division One opportunities with Cradley Heathens, Newport Wasps, and Hackney Hawks. In 1972 his average rose to almost 10 points per match, and he doubled up in Division One with Oxford Rebels, averaging over 6. He was selected for the Young England (Division Two) team that won a series against Sweden in 1972, and injury prevented him travelling with the Great Britain team that toured Australia the following Winter. He moved to Oxford full-time in 1973, and again averaged over 6. In 1974 he rode for Poole Pirates, but departed after a few matches, and signed for Leicester Lions. He struggled to score consistently, partly due to mechanical problems, and retired from the sport before the season ended.

In 2007 he joined Lewis Bridger's pit crew.

References

Living people
British speedway riders
English motorcycle racers
Eastbourne Eagles riders
Oxford Cheetahs riders
Poole Pirates riders
Leicester Lions riders
Cradley Heathens riders
Newport Wasps riders
Hackney Hawks riders
Year of birth missing (living people)